In Greek mythology, the name Presbon (Ancient Greek: Πρέσβων "elder, senior") may refer to:

Presbon, a son of Phrixus and Chalciope (Iophassa), daughter of King Aeetes of Colchis, mentioned in few sources, and never enumerated alongside his brothers Argus, Phrontis, Melas and Cytisorus. Upon return from Colchis to Boeotia, he received his grandfather Athamas' kingdom back from the latter's adoptive heirs Haliartus and Coronus. The kingdom further passed over to his son Clymenus.
Presbon, a son of Minyas and Clytodora.
Presbon, father of Spledon (Aspledon) by Sterope.
Presbon, the young son of Clymenus (Periclymenus), whom Harpalyce killed and served to Clymenus as a meal in revenge for the rape.

Notes

References 

 Pausanias, Description of Greece with an English Translation by W.H.S. Jones, Litt.D., and H.A. Ormerod, M.A., in 4 Volumes. Cambridge, MA, Harvard University Press; London, William Heinemann Ltd. 1918. . Online version at the Perseus Digital Library
 Pausanias, Graeciae Descriptio. 3 vols. Leipzig, Teubner. 1903.  Greek text available at the Perseus Digital Library.

Family of Athamas
Boeotian characters in Greek mythology
Colchian characters in Greek mythology
Minyan characters in Greek mythology
Boeotian mythology